The Shire of Bridgetown–Greenbushes is a local government area in the South West region of Western Australia, about  southeast of Bunbury and about  south of the state capital, Perth.

History

The Shire of Bridgetown–Greenbushes was established on 26 March 1970 with the amalgamation of the Shire of Bridgetown and the Shire of Greenbushes.

Wards
Since 2021, the shire is no longer divided into wards.  The nine shire councillors each represent the entire shire.

Towns and localities
The towns and localities of the Shire of Bridgetown-Greenbushes with population and size figures based on the most recent Australian census:

Heritage-listed places

As of 2023, 139 places are heritage-listed in the Shire of Bridgetown–Greenbushes, of which twelve are on the State Register of Heritage Places, among them the Freemasons Hotel, Bridgetown.

References

External links
 

Bridgetown
Bridgetown, Western Australia
Greenbushes, Western Australia